Bisbee Douglas International Airport  is a county-owned airport  northwest of Douglas and  east of Bisbee, both in Cochise County, Arizona, United States, that was formerly known as Douglas Army Airfield (Douglas AAF). The FAA's National Plan of Integrated Airport Systems for 2009–2013 categorizes it as a general aviation facility.

History

World War II
Bisbee Douglas International Airport was constructed during World War II as a U.S. Army Air Forces installation known as Douglas Army Airfield. Douglas AAF conducted advanced training in the AT-9 Jeep, AT-17 BobcT, and C-45 Expeditor training aircraft and the B-25 Mitchell bomber.

In addition to Douglas AAF, five auxiliary airfields were constructed in the area for emergency and overflow use:
 McNeal Field (Aux #1) 
 Forrest Field (Aux #2) 
 Webb Coutland (Elfrida) Field (Aux #3)  
 Auxiliary Field 4 is unknown
 Hereford Army Airfield (Aux #5)

Historical airline service

With the end of World War II, Douglas AAF was considered surplus to military needs and was transferred to local government authorities of the City of Douglas for conversion to a civilian airport. American Airlines served the airport as Bisbee/Douglas was a stop along a transcontinental multi-stop route. The carrier flew Douglas DC-3, Convair 240, and by 1952 Douglas DC-6 propliners with daily flights in each direction between the east coast and the west coast. In 1959 the westbound routing was New York Newark (EWR) – Philadelphia (PHL) – Washington D.C. (DCA) – Memphis (MEM) – Fort Worth (GSW) – El Paso (ELP) – Bisbee/Douglas (DUG) – Tucson (TUS) – Phoenix (PHX) – San Diego (SAN) – Los Angeles (LAX). By 1963, American was still serving the airport with two daily flights operated with the DC-6. The westbound routing was Dallas (DAL) – Midland/Odessa (MAF) – El Paso – Bisbee/Douglas – Tucson – Phoenix – San Diego – Los Angeles. American Airlines flights ended in 1965 and were replaced with commuter flights to Tucson and Phoenix provided by Apache Airlines using de Havilland Dove aircraft.

The original Frontier Airlines (1950-1986) briefly served Bisbee/Douglas in the early 1950s using DC-3s on flights to Phoenix, stopping at Nogales and Tucson, Arizona.

Apache Airlines service ended in 1970 and was followed by Cochise Airlines which served the airport from 1971 through 1975 using de Havilland Twin Otters.

Copper State Airlines provided service from 1980 through 1982 using Piper Navajos.

Sierra Vista Aviation was the final carrier at Bisbee/Douglas from 1983 through 1987 also using Piper Navajos.

Facilities
It has two asphalt runways: 17/35 is 7,311 by 100 feet (2,228 x 30 m) and 8/26 is 5,000 by 75 feet (1,524 x 23 m).

In the year ending March 31, 2009 the airport had 19,650 aircraft operations, average 53 per day: 71% general aviation and 29% military. 19 aircraft were then based at the airport: 95% single-engine and 5% multi-engine.

See also

 List of airports in Arizona
 Arizona World War II Army Airfields
 37th Flying Training Wing (World War II)

References

 Manning, Thomas A. (2005), History of Air Education and Training Command, 1942–2002.  Office of History and Research, Headquarters, AETC, Randolph AFB, Texas  
 Shaw, Frederick J. (2004), Locating Air Force Base Sites, History’s Legacy, Air Force History and Museums Program, United States Air Force, Washington DC.

External links

 Douglas Army Airfield in World War II
 Bisbee – Douglas International Airport (DUG) at Arizona DOT airport directory
 Aerial image as of 8 October 1996 from USGS The National Map

Airports established in 1908
1942 establishments in Arizona
Airports in Cochise County, Arizona
World War II airfields in the United States
Airfields of the United States Army Air Forces in Arizona
USAAF Western Flying Training Command
American Theater of World War II
1928 establishments in Arizona